The Schauder Hotel was a historic building located in downtown Davenport, Iowa, United States. It was built in the Italianate style facing the Mississippi River, and it was listed on the National Register of Historic Places in 1983.

History
Louis Schauder built the hotel in 1876. At the time it was one of five hotels in a two-block section of West Front Street (now West River Drive). Schauder also operated the neighboring Perry Hotel. A saloon and music hall operated in the hotel by the 1880s. The hotel continued in operation until the turn of the 20th-century. Eventually the building was acquired by the Petersen, Harned, and Von Maur department store and used for storage. It, along with the neighboring Clifton-Metropolitan Hotel, the J.H.C. Petersen's Sons Wholesale Building and the Schick's Express and Transfer Co., were torn down to make way for a public parking structure and the Davenport Skybridge. It was delisted from the National Register in 2014.

Architecture
The three-story commercial building featured a four-bay facade above the ground floor. The tall, narrow windows with the decorative window hoods on the second and third floors expressed the Italianate style. The ground floor had been updated in later years and the original cornice was either partially removed or replaced.

References

Commercial buildings completed in 1876
Italianate architecture in Iowa
Former buildings and structures in Davenport, Iowa
Former National Register of Historic Places in Iowa
Hotel buildings on the National Register of Historic Places in Iowa
National Register of Historic Places in Davenport, Iowa
Demolished buildings and structures in Iowa